The Auckland Warriors 1997 season was the Auckland Warriors 3rd first-grade season. The club competed in Australasia's Super League. The coach of the team was John Monie until he was replaced by Frank Endacott after Round 9 while Matthew Ridge was the club's captain.

Milestones
12 April - Round 7: Sean Hoppe plays his 50th match for the club.
19 April - Round 8: Gene Ngamu and Tea Ropati play in their 50th match for the club.
27 April - Round 9: Stephen Kearney plays his 50th match for the club.
6 July - Round 14: Stacey Jones plays his 50th match for the club.

Jersey & Sponsors

The Warriors adopted a new  in 1997 that matched the Super League style used by the other nine teams in the competition. The jerseys were made by Nike, Inc.

Fixtures

The Warriors used Ericsson Stadium as their home ground in 1997, their only home ground since they entered the competition in 1995.

Regular season

World Club Challenge Finals

Ladder

WCC Australasia Pool A

Squad

The Warriors used 29 players in 1997, including four players making their first grade debuts.

A cross (†) next to a name denotes that the player played in the 1997 World Club Championship.

Staff
Chief Executive Officer: Ian Robson, replaced by Bill MacGowan in February 1997

Coaching Staff
Head Coach: John Monie, replaced by Frank Endacott in late April 1997.
Reserve Grade Coach: Frank Endacott, replaced by Gary Kemble.
Under 19 Coach: John Ackland

Transfers

Gains

Losses

Awards
Stacey Jones won the club's Player of the Year award.

Other Teams
The Warriors fielded teams in both Super League's reserve grade and the Under-19 competition (The Mal Meninga Cup). The Reserve Grade side finished fourth and then beat Cronulla, Perth and North Queensland to make the Grand Final while the Under 19's finished the regular season as minor premiers, beating Penrith to make the Grand Final. Ultimately however both sides lost their respective Grand Finals, with the reserve grade going down 12-40 and the Under-19's losing 12–27.

Grand Final Teams
Reserve Grade: Glen Coughlan, Iva Ropati, David Bailey, Joe Galuvao, Paul Staladi, Meti Noovao, Aaron Whittaker, Hitro Okesene, Steve Buckingham, Grant Young, Tony Tuimavave, Jerry Seu Seu, Bryan Henare. Bench: Ben Fahey, Frank Watene, Paul Rauhihi, Ricky Henry. Coach: Gary Kemble.

Under-19: Junior Lemafa, Odell Manuel, Tai Savea, Peter Lewis, Mark Fakahua, Monty Betham, Anthony Clyde, David Solomona, Lee Wetherill, Pewhairangi Jones, Kylie Leuluai, Filimone Lolohea, Ali Lauitiiti. Bench: Steve Murray, Scott Dewhurst, Fale Falemoe, Jonathan Smith. Coach: John Ackland.

References

External links
Warriors official site
1997 Warriors Season

New Zealand Warriors seasons
Auckland Warriors season
War